Yale Model Government Europe (YMGE) is a constituent program of the Yale International Relations Association (YIRA) at Yale University. Founded in 2010 under the auspices of the YIRA Independent Initiatives Program, YMGE is now a registered civic organization in the Czech Republic. The inaugural conference, YMGE 2011, took place in November 2011 in Prague hosting delegates from around the world. The second annual YMGE in 2012 drew 300 students from 25 countries spanning four continents. From 2013 onwards, YMGE has been hosted in Budapest, Hungary, and has now risen to about 375 attending delegates each year. Beginning in 2019, YMGE has relocated to Lisbon, Portugal, where it has expanded its attendance to include delegates from across the globe.

Conference information
YMGE was created in an effort to reimagine the Model United Nations conference in a way that would be both more educational and more dynamic for delegates. It combines the best of American and European conference styles to create a hybrid, crisis-based format. The conference comprises two types of sessions. In standard committee debate, delegates in YMGE's 12x12 crisis fixture are placed in a Cabinet representing the different ministers of each of 12 European Union nations, where they address pressing issues within (and sometimes across) their nations' borders. When YMGE's unique crisis arc is revealed, delegates shift into Councils, which are 12 E.U. bodies made up of ministers of the same position from all 12 Cabinets. During these crisis sessions, delegates have the urgent responsibility of dealing with the crisis at hand within the bounds of their Council's authority and power. As in the real world, these committees form the framework of an integrated Europe: when something happens in the world that affects one committee, it affects all committees. Every committee will be kept abreast of developments in each of the others; if a new policy passed by the Belgian cabinet has repercussions in Denmark, it will be up to the Danish ministers to react.

Outside of this 12x12 crisis structure, YMGE offers four Specialized Bodies for novice and intermediate delegates alike. While these committees are not integrated into the crisis, they feature dynamic issues that challenge delegates to think effectively and creatively.

Mission
With the development of the mission to provide an innovative, collaborative, and inspiring environment in Europe for high school students to engage in high-level debate and diplomacy, YMGE has changed its slogan to "Inspire, Collaborate, Innovate" to accurately reflect the qualities that the conference embraces.

In preparation for the 2013 conference and others moving forward, Secretariat members have revised YMGE's mission, vision and values.

Leadership
YMGE's leadership consists of a Secretariat of eight members. At its helm, YMGE's current president is Ahmed Alananzeh. Two Directors General, making up the Senior Secretariat, manage YMGE's Committees and Operations sides. Committees encompasses all of the Cabinets, Councils, and Specialized Bodies that delegates participate in, recruitment of Yale University undergraduates to lead committees, and YMGE's educational mission. Operations leads YMGE's recruitment efforts of European and international delegations, programming during the conference, and all logistical aspects of the conference.

Five Under-Secretaries-General make up YMGE's Core Secretariat, in charge of International Recruitment, European Recruitment, Conference, Branding, and Committees. Sixteen Directors prepare and lead YMGE's Cabinets, Councils, and Specialized Bodies.

Hosts 
 2011 - Prague, Czech Republic
 2012 - Prague, Czech Republic
 2013 - Budapest, Hungary
 2014 - Budapest, Hungary
 2015 - Budapest, Hungary
 2016 - Budapest, Hungary
 2017 - Budapest, Hungary
 2018 - Budapest, Hungary
 2019 - Lisbon, Portugal
 2023 - Athens, Greece

See also 
 List of Yale University student organizations
 Model Congress
 Yale Political Union
 Yale International Relations Association

References

External links
 Yale Model Government Europe website
 Yale International Relations Association website
 Yale Model United Nations website
 Yale University website

Yale University
International conferences
Youth model government